Eminence may refer to:

Places
 Eminence, Arkansas, a place in Arkansas, U.S.
 Eminence, Indiana, U.S.
 Eminence, Kansas, U.S.
 Eminence, Kentucky, U.S.
 Eminence, Mississippi, in Covington County, Mississippi, U.S.
 Eminence, Missouri, U.S.
 Eminence, New York, a place in New York, U.S.
 Eminence Township, Logan County, Illinois, U.S.

Other uses
 Eminence (anatomy), a variety of structures
 Eminence (style), a pre-nominal honorific used for high nobility and clergy
 Eminence, a 1996 novel by Morris West
 Eminence (yacht), built in 2008
 The Eminence, a historic estate house in Auburndale, Newton, Massachusetts, U.S.
 Eminence, an electronic music duo, contributors to Erebus I
 Eminence Symphony Orchestra, based in Sydney, Australia

See also

 Eminent (disambiguation)
 Imminence (disambiguation)
 Prominence (disambiguation)
 "Eminence Front", a 1982 song by The Who
 Éminence grise, powerful advisor or decision-maker who operates secretly or unofficially
 Immanence, the divine encompasses or is manifested in the material world.